Kingdom is an unincorporated community in Lee County, Illinois, United States.

References

Unincorporated communities in Illinois
Unincorporated communities in Lee County, Illinois